Criniger is a genus of songbirds in the bulbul family, Pycnonotidae. The species of Criniger are found in western and central Africa.

Taxonomy
The genus Criniger was introduced in 1820 by the Dutch zoologist Coenraad Jacob Temminck, the name Criniger is Latin for "long-haired" (from crinis, meaning "hair" and gerere, meaning "to carry"). A year later Temminck designated the type species as the western bearded greenbul.

Species
The genus contains five species:
Western bearded greenbul (Criniger barbatus)
Eastern bearded greenbul (Criniger chloronotus)
Red-tailed greenbul (Criniger calurus)
White-bearded greenbul (Criniger ndussumensis)
Yellow-bearded greenbul (Criniger olivaceus)

Former species
Formerly, some authorities also considered the following species (or subspecies) as species within the genus Criniger:
 Striated bulbul (as Tricophorus striatus or Criniger striatus)
 Streak-eared bulbul (as Criniger Conradi)
 Western greenbul (as Trichophorus tephrolaemus)
 Olive-headed greenbul (as Criniger olivaceiceps)
 Golden greenbul (as Criniger serinus)
 Honeyguide greenbul (as Criniger indicator)
 Upper Guinea honeyguide greenbul (as Trichophorus leucurus)
 Yellow-bellied greenbul (as Trichophorus flaviventris)
 Falkenstein's greenbul (as Criniger Falkensteini)
 Simple greenbul (as Trichophorus simplex)
 Yellow-throated leaflove (as Trichophorus flavicollis or Criniger flavicollis)
 Uganda yellow-throated greenbul (as Trichophorus flavigula)
 Northern brownbul (as Criniger strepitans)
 Fischer's greenbul (as Criniger Fischeri)
 Cabanis's greenbul (as Criniger cabanisi)
 Icterine greenbul (as Trichophorus icterinus)
 Red-tailed bristlebill (multicolor) (as Criniger multicolor)
 Green-tailed bristlebill (as Trichophorus eximius)
 Yellow-lored bristlebill (as Trichophorus notatus)
 Grey-headed bristlebill (as Trichophorus canicapillus)
 Finsch's bulbul (as Criniger finschi)
 White-throated bulbul (as Trichophorus flaveolus or Criniger flaveolus)
 White-throated bulbul (burmanicus) (as Criniger burmanicus)
 Puff-throated bulbul (as Criniger pallidus)
 Grey-crowned bulbul (as Criniger griseiceps)
 Puff-throated bulbul (henrici) (as Criniger Henrici)
 Ochraceous bulbul (as Criniger ochraceus)
 Ochraceous bulbul (sordidus) (as Criniger sordidus)
 Ochraceous bulbul (sumatranus) (as Criniger sumatranus)
 Ochraceous bulbul (ruficrissus) (as Criniger ruficrissus)
 Grey-cheeked bulbul (as Criniger bres)
 Grey-cheeked bulbul (tephrogenys) (as Trichophorus tephrogenys)
 Grey-cheeked bulbul (gutturalis) (as Trichophorus gutturalis or Criniger gutturalis)
 Palawan bulbul (as Criniger frater)
 Yellow-bellied bulbul (as Criniger phaeocephalus)
 Yellow-bellied bulbul (diardi) (as Criniger diardi)
 Yellow-bellied bulbul (sulphuratus) (as Trichophorus sulphuratus)
 Yellow-browed bulbul (as Trichophorus indicus)
 Yellow-browed bulbul (icterica) (as Criniger ictericus)
 Hairy-backed bulbul (as Trichophorus minutus)
 Hairy-backed bulbul (sericeus) (as Criniger sericea)
 Grey-eyed bulbul (as Criniger propinquus)
 Charlotte's bulbul (as Criniger charlottae)
 Sulphur-bellied bulbul (as Criniger palawanensis)
 Seram golden bulbul (as Criniger affinis)
 Ambon golden bulbul (as Trichophorus flavicaudus)
 Northern golden bulbul (as Criniger longirostris)
 Sangihe golden bulbul (as Criniger Platenae)
 Togian golden bulbul (as Criniger aureus)
 Halmahera golden bulbul (as Criniger Chloris)
 Buru golden bulbul (as Criniger mystacalis)
 Yellowish bulbul (as Criniger Everetti)
 Sulu bulbul (as Criniger Haynaldi)

References

Further reading

 
Bird genera
Greenbuls
 
Taxonomy articles created by Polbot